Montegabbro is a village in Tuscany, central Italy, located in the comune of Colle di Val d'Elsa, province of Siena. At the time of the 2001 census its population was 14.

References 

Frazioni of Colle di Val d'Elsa